Nice to Meet You (Acoustic Live Solo) is the second extended play by Italian singer Francesca Michielin. It was released in Italy on 30 January 2016 through Sony Music Entertainment Italy. The EP peaked at number 52 on the Italian Albums Chart.

Track listing

Chart performance

Weekly charts

Release history

References

2016 EPs
Francesca Michielin albums